Andriy Oliynyk may refer to:
 Andriy Petrovych Oliynyk (born 1983), Ukrainian footballer
 Andriy Oliynyk (footballer born 1986), Ukrainian footballer

See also
 Oliynyk